Ninchi is a surname. Notable people with the surname include:

Annibale Ninchi (1887–1967), Italian actor, playwright and drama teacher
Arnaldo Ninchi (1935–2013), Italian actor, voice actor, and basketball player
Ave Ninchi (1915–1997), Italian actress
Carlo Ninchi (1897–1974), Italian actor